Tarrant Keyneston is a village and civil parish in Dorset, England. In the 2011 census the parish had 152 dwellings, 145 households and a population of 310.

On the hills northwest of the village are the earthworks of Buzbury Rings (or Busbury Rings), the remains of an Iron Age and Romano-British fortified encampment or settlement, described by Sir Frederick Treves in 1905 as "a circle of entrenchments, composed of a stout vallum and a ditch". The site has been much damaged by ploughing and by the road between Wimborne Minster and Blandford Forum, which crosses the site.

The village's parish church has a 15th-century tower, though the rest of the building was rebuilt in 1852 by Thomas Henry Wyatt. The chancel of the earlier building contained an anchorite's cell. The Bishop of Salisbury Richard Poore is most likely to have been buried at Tarrant Keyneston in accordance with his wishes.

Almost all of Tarrant Keyneston parish is within the Cranborne Chase and West Wiltshire Downs Area of Outstanding Natural Beauty (AONB).

References

External links

Villages in Dorset